Macrocoma brunnea is a species of leaf beetle of Yemen, described by Gilbert Ernest Bryant in 1957.

References

brunnea
Beetles of Asia
Beetles described in 1957
Insects of the Arabian Peninsula
Endemic fauna of Yemen